Renfrew is an elevated station on the Millennium Line of Metro Vancouver's SkyTrain rapid transit system. The station is located on East 12th Avenue at Renfrew Street, north of Grandview Highway in Vancouver, British Columbia, Canada.

The station serves the nearby LaSalle College Vancouver (formerly the Art Institute of Vancouver), as well as several office buildings, big box stores and local businesses.

Station information

Station layout

Entrances
Renfrew station is served by a single entrance located at the east end of the station. The entrance is located at the southwest corner of the intersection at Renfrew Street and 12th Avenue.

Transit connections

Renfrew station provides connections within Vancouver and is serviced by HandyDART. Routes are as follows:

References

External links

Millennium Line stations
Railway stations in Canada opened in 2002
Buildings and structures in Vancouver
2002 establishments in British Columbia